"Age of X" is a comic book storyline published by Marvel Comics as part of its X-Men series. The storyline is set in an alternate reality known as Earth-11326. Running from January to April 2011, it is similar in name and tone to the 1995 "Age of Apocalypse" (AoA) storyline.

Plot

Background
After the announcement of the storyline in December 2010, Marvel added QR codes on selected comics. These codes were linked to five different historical logs, each providing background for the "Age of X".
 Log 1A: "Anti-mutant protestors beat mutant-rights advocate Henry McCoy to death during the March For Purity in Washington, D.C."
 Log 2B: "The mutant abilities of a young mutant named Jean Grey manifested in the form of an explosive, fiery phoenix that immolates everything in its path. The city of Albany, New York, is decimated, leaving 600,000 dead."
 Log 3C: After the Phoenix demolished Albany, New York, the U.S. government sponsors the mass production of Exonim Sentinels: technologically advanced combat vehicles designed to subdue mutants. In the months that follow, the mutant population drastically declines; this period becomes known as "the Decimation". The log shows a dead Scarlet Witch, while  Quicksilver fights an Exonim.
 Log4D: "As anti-mutants hysteria spreads, legislation is passed that requires all mutants to be imprisoned and, in most cases, executed. When a fugitive mutant that Reed Richards has allowed shelter in the Baxter Building (despite wife Sue Storm's protests) accidentally injures her son  Franklin, Sue reports Richards to the authorities. To demonstrate that no one is above the law, the Fantastic Four is publicly arrested and marched out of the Baxter Building in handcuffs." The log shows that the harbored mutant is Wolfsbane.
 Log5E: "In the aftermath of the decimation, only a fraction of the worldwide mutant population remains at large. These fugitive mutants are believed to be the most powerful... and the most dangerous. To track down and eliminate these threats, the United States assembles a group of human superheroes. They are called The Avengers." The log shows team members Captain America, Iron Man, Hulk, Ghost Rider, the Invisible Woman (Sue Storm) and Redback (Jessica Drew).

Storyline
The mutants are almost extinct, tortured by a strike force led by Colonel Graydon Creed. The first signs of the Age of X appeared in X-Men: Legacy #244; the events were removed from the Earth-616 mainstream continuity, with no memories of the alternate lives.

The primary event occurs 1,000 days after Magneto moved most of the mutants to Fortress X, their last bastion. Human forces are trying to reach the citadel; although they have always failed to do so, they have inflicted many casualties on the mutants. Legacy/Rogue acts as a "Reaper", storing the thoughts of those killed in battle. After one of her reapings, Legacy sees the capture of Shadowcat (who was returning from a mission in the outside world). Rogue finds the camera which Shadowcat is trying to hide, and discovers that all the pictures in it are blank. Using Madison Jeffries's absorbed powers, Legacy infiltrates the X-Brig (Fortress X's detention facility) to question Shadowcat. There she is seen by the Earth-616 Blindfold, who hints that this reality is "wrong" and asks her to ask Professor X about the "scar tissue". As she speaks with Shadowcat and touches a comatose Xavier, Legacy begins a mental attack on every mutant inside the fortress; seen by Danger, she becomes a fugitive. Hunted by Dani Moonstar's Cadre, she is saved by Gambit. They are attacked by Magneto, who fakes their deaths and explains that he sent Shadowcat out to investigate because he is convinced something is wrong. As Magneto returns to the brig to free Shadowcat and Professor X, X (the voice controlling Fortress X) sends the Cadre after him. Gambit and Legacy (who are in the room at the center of the fortress) discover that their universe has been stolen and is kept in a box. When Professor X is freed, he telepathically shows his pursuers and a reluctant Legion the truth about himself and the reality in which they think they are living. The Age of X was created when Legion's mind reacted to Doctor Nemesis's attempt to restore it to sanity. A new persona (with new powers) was born, creating a new reality to protect Legion's personalities. This manifestation of Legion's power assumed the appearance of Moira MacTaggert to confuse Xavier and protect Legion. Moira confronted Legacy and Gambit, revealing that she is also X. Cornered by Xavier, X launches a last offensive on the fortress.

Moira removes the walls, allowing the humans to enter the fortress. Legion appears, while Xavier, Magneto and Shadowcat try to stop Moira, who created the universe so Legion could be the hero he always wanted to be. Weeping in his arms, she promises to create as many universes for him as he wants. While Moira is distracted, Legion absorbs her back into his body and erases all the humans fighting the mutants. He goes to the battlefield, apologizes and rewrites the universe (returning everything to the way it was). The entire timeline lasts for seven days in reality and the mutants return to Utopia with the memory of their 616 lives; Xavier and Emma Frost reveal that the telepaths will help anyone who wants to lose their Age of X memories.

Characters

Heroes
The mutant resistance was formed by Magneto to protect the surviving mutants from Graydon Creed and his mutant-hunters:

 Cannonball – Labeled a traitor by his sister, Husk, when he convinced her there was not enough time to avenge the murder of their family. Husk forced him to create X-Force before joining Magneto.
 Cyclops – Known as "Basilisk," he was forced by prison warden Arcade to kill his brother and dozens of mutants. Unable to control his powers (because his eyelids were removed), he wears a mask to hide his optic blasts. After escaping from prison, Basilisk killed Arcade and joined Magneto. He is married to Joanna Cargill. With Wolverine, Basilisk investigated the events in Fortress X as redemption for his past as an executioner.
 Dazzler – Attacked by Exonim soldiers during a concert, she retreated to the Manhattan sewers with Angel Salvadore and Gabriel Cohuelo. Tracked down and teleported to Fortress X by Doctor Strange, Dazzler becomes one of Magneto's soldiers.
 Force Warriors – Five psionically powered mutants who protect the walls of Fortess X by channeling their powers to create force walls. The Force Warriors do not fight, but form a defensive force. The force walls they psionically create after each battle slow the human forces; the humans waste time breaking down the walls, destroying the element of surprise.
 Hellion – Similar to the one in X-Men: Second Coming, this Hellion is disabled; however, he is missing his arms instead of hands, and uses telekinesis to levitate gauntlets which serve as hands.
 Revenant – At first, nothing is known about her where she appears amnesic. Revenant claims that she became lost on her way home and does not look like herself. When reality was restored, she is revealed as Rachel Summers.
 Legion – Here, he shows no sign of instability or multiple powers. He only displays telekinesis (a power belonging to his sub-persona, Jack Wayne). To protect his step-mother Moira, he is determined to prevent the destruction of Fortress X by Legacy and Magneto.
 Psylocke – Here, Betsy never switched bodies with Kwannon. She possesses telekinetic abilities and she is romantically involved with Iceman.
 Carmella Unuscione – Code-named "Stand-Off" here.
 Frenzy – Frenzy was captured after a number of attacks and incarcerated on Ryker's Island. Before arriving at Fortress X, Joanna and Tempo were members of the Mutant Liberation Front. Here, she is married to Cyclops. Unlike nearly all of the others, Frenzy chooses to retain her memories of the Age of X and they galvanize her into become a better person by joining the X-Men. 
 Gambit – Same mentality as his Earth-616 counterpart, using a long rifle instead of the usual bo staff.
 Husk – With her brother Cannonball, she tried to save her family (who had been arrested) only to find them murdered and their bodies in the back of a garbage truck. Although she tried to kill the guards, Cannonball convinced her that there was not enough time for vengeance. They helped the freed mutants escape before the Exonims arrived, but Husk swore she would not return to flesh and blood until her brother repented for his crime against their family's honor. Before joining Magneto, she forced her brother to form X-Force and killed Copycat.
 Iceman – Romantically involved with Psylocke.
 Madison Jeffries – Spends most of his time in the Fortress X observatory, unsuccessfully trying to measure starlight. His theories relate to the box containing the universe later found by Gambit and Legacy.
 Magneto – Leader of the mutant resistance. When they were on the verge of extinction, Magneto flew 22 Manhattan skyscrapers (and the mutants trapped in them) to safety. He later used those buildings (with the Chrysler Building, the Empire State Building and Grand Central Terminal) to build Fortress X as a haven for mutants who help him. As Fortress X's creator and mutant leader, Magneto created a strict code to keep everyone safe. However, he later ignored his rules to investigate the oddities in Fortress X, the outside world and X.
 Moonstar's Cadre – The Fortress X hunters. When Legacy escapes from the brig and Magneto suspected of betrayal, they are the designated team for the missions.
 Cypher – Captured and imprisoned in a prison on the Pacific coast, Cypher escaped and joined Magneto. As Warlock, he is shown to be techno-organic.
 Dust – First appeared hiding with mutants before being rescued by Magneto, she later joins the Moonstar Cadre. This version of Dust is harsher, crueler and more lenient in her Muslim beliefs.
 Karma – Her leg is mechanical, consistent with the "Second Coming" arc.
 Magma – Came from Brazil via Mexico to join Magneto in Nevada.
 Danielle Moonstar – Leader and the tracker of the team. Nothing is known about her mutant powers here.
 Sunspot – Known as Eclipse in this reality.
 Mystique – Raven and Irene Alder raised their adopted daughter, Anna-Marie, until they tested X-gene positive and were arrested. Anna-Marie was not tested or arrested. Mystique escaped (or was freed), and it is unknown what happened to her partner Irene. Mystique later met Magneto, and worked with him for some time. She was present when Magneto used skyscrapers to create Fortress X. Later, in one of Tempo's memories, it is learned that she was captured and held captive by the Sapiens League. She escaped and returned to Fortress X, where she was killed by Captain America while protecting a group of mutant children.
 Namor – Left the oceans to live in Fortress X and follow Storm, his love interest here.
 Pixie – Known as "Nightmare" after the Bleecker Street Massacre, trading her butterfly wings for bat wings. She went to Fortress X, joining Magneto.
 Rogue – Known here as "Legacy," Magneto chooses her to keep the memory of the mutants by absorbing their dying memories (hence her nickname, "Reaper").
 Storm – In a relationship with Namor. She was mentioned as the leader of the Storm Cadre.
 Tempo – Died defending Fortress X against a human attack. Before coming there, Heather and Frenzy were members of the Mutant Liberation Front.
 Wolverine – Seen in flashback as weakened after Kavita Rao injects him with several doses of a serum designed to cure the mutant gene, counting on his healing factor to destroy the cure. He is unable to fight, since his remaining mutant powers are focused on keeping him alive despite his adamantium disease. Wolverine tends bar at the Rat Run in Fortress X. He is aware of the odd events in the fortress. After helping Legacy escape from Moonstar's Cadre, he decides to investigate.

Other X-Men characters appear in the storyline in marginal roles and as inhabitants of Fortress X, including Angel, Anole, Avalanche, Beak, Bling!, Chamber, Colossus, Dr. Cecilia Reyes, Domino, Forge, Gentle, Indra, Jubilee, Lady Mastermind, Loa, Martinique Jason, Northstar, Rockslide, Scalphunter, Surge, Toad, Trance, Vertigo and Warpath (here known as Berserker).

X-Brig mutants
Dangerous mutants are locked in Fortress X's X-Brig. Most have telepathic powers and wear helmets to inhibit them. X used the brig to imprison Professor X, who knew his true nature and convinced the other mutants that telepathic powers cannot exist; if they did, they would be very dangerous. On Magneto's orders, Danger is the only warden of the brig and runs it with several drone copies of herself. Among the inmates are:

 Blindfold – The Earth-616 Blindfold who knows that this reality should not exist.
 Emma Frost – Seen during Magneto's first visit to the X-Brig. She is seen wearing a helmet to inhibit her powers.
 Magik – Also seen during Magneto's first visit to the X-Brig. She wears a helmet to inhibit her powers.
 Martha Johansson – Also seen during Magneto's first visit to the X-Brig. She wears a helmet to inhibit her powers.
 Professor X – Initially shown in a comatose state. After being freed by Shadowcat and Magneto, Professor X retains knowledge of the 616 reality (probably because X could not create false memories in telepaths.
 Shadowcat – Sneaked outside Fortress X and took 247 blank pictures of the outside world. After being interrogated by Legacy, she was left in the brig and later freed by Magneto.
 Stepford Cuckoos – They were seen during Magneto's first visit to the X-Brig. They wear helmets to inhibit their powers.

Villains
 Arcade: Arcade was the prison governor of the mutant prison and responsible for making Basilisk kill his brother Havok. Basilisk later escaped and killed Arcade.
 General Frank Castle – Multi-decorated chief of the Avengers, who orders the killing of the occupants of Fortress X. His true intentions are genocide using the Avengers to assassinate Magneto so a nuclear strike can be carried out. When this fails, he informs the Avengers of his intentions to kill them, and sends Hulk to carry out an assault. He survives the explosion, but is blocked from further attack by the newly formed Force Wall.
 Avengers – The Avengers were tasked into hunting mutants. The team was formed 1,000 days before the story, when General Frank Castle summoned the soon-to-be Avengers (some already mutant hunters) to quell a riot at Camp Gorge (an exclusion zone inside the Grand Canyon). The team's first mission was to kill the mutants Magneto saved after his escape from Manhattan. During their assault on Fortress X they discover a group of mutant children, and abandon their mission. It is revealed to them that their purpose is to carry out a suicide mission, and the team sacrifice their lives to protect the mutant refugees from the Hulk.
 Captain America – Leader of the Avengers, Captain America struggles to control his team. During the mission, he kills a mutant who was protecting a group of mutant children. Realizing his mistake, he calls off the mission and leads the Avengers to defend Fortress X. He is killed battling the Hulk, but his words and actions inspire the mutant forces to band together. Legacy absorbs his memories to honor his sacrifice.
 Ghost Rider – Apparently killed by Chamber on his first mission.
 Hulk – Dr. Bruce Banner was involved in mutant experiments for the government. During a sterilization experiment, a prisoner panicked causing the device to explode and transforming Banner into the Hulk. Immediately after his transformation, he killed his colleagues and his fiancée which caused him to harbor a hatred of mutants. His role in the Avengers is a contingency plan, should they fail in their mission. The Hulk is killed by Redback using Iron Man's right glove while trying to deliver a chemical bomb to Fortress X.
 Invisible Woman – After her son Franklin Richards was nearly attacked by Wolfsbane, she exposed her to the mutant hunters and the rest of the Fantastic Four were arrested for harboring a mutant. She later joined the Avengers. She is determined to stop her fellow Avengers from killing mutants, apparently out of remorse for what she did to the rest of the Fantastic Four. She is killed by the Hulk while trying to protect Fortress X from a military assault.
 Iron Man – Tony Stark was infected with a virus after a confrontation with Madison Jefferies and permanently fused to his suit. Slowly being digested by the suit, he is a corpse animated by machinery and jokingly calls himself a "steel corpse". When the team calls off the mission, an emergency override takes over his armor and tries to kill the mutant children in the room. At his request, Captain America kills him with a shot to the back of the head and his right glove is used by Redback to kill the Hulk.
 Spider-Woman – Here, Spider-Woman is known as Redback. A silent, coldblooded killer, she follows orders and was responsible for killing Mr. Sinister. She finally speaks after the discovery of the mutant children in Fortress X, saying that their mission is "wrong". After Sue is killed by the Hulk Redback uses Iron Man's severed glove to detonate the explosive, killing herself and Banner.
 Dr. Richard Palance (Pandemic) – Richard Palance is shown working with Dr. Kavita Rao on a mutant cure, before Rao kills him in a confrontation with Wolverine.
 Exonim – A robotic strike-force team which hunts mutants under Graydon Creed's orders, this storyline's version of the Sentinels.
 Graydon Creed – The unseen Creed is a colonel who led the mutant hunters in an attempt to exterminate them.
 X – The only female villain in the AoX, she is the voice controlling Fortress X and creator of the army the mutants must fight daily. Born as a new, unknown personality, she is a reaction to Doctor Nemesis's work on Legion's mind; Nemesis was trying to restore Legion's sanity by isolating him and purging all his personalities. X killed all the imprisoned personalities, using them (and all the minds in Utopia) to create a new environment where Legion would be happy and known as a hero. Xavier suspected that Legion's mind was trying to rebel, and tried to fight X in Legion's mind. X assumed the appearance of Moira MacTaggert to confuse him, and imprisoned everyone inside Fortress X. X became the guardian voice of Fortress X, using her appearance as Moira to control Legion and revealing that she kept the old universe safe for sentimental reasons. X tries to destroy the original universe, but is stopped when Legion sees what she has done for him. He reabsorbs her into his mind, using her powers to restore reality to normal. Whether X remains a threat is unknown.

Other characters
 Angel Salvadore – Retreated to the sewers of Manhattan as a fugitive with Dazzler and Gabriel Cohuelo. After being tracked down by Doctor Strange, she is teleported to Fortress X with her two companions.
 Aurora – Mentioned by Northstar as having been killed by soldiers.
 Beast – Hank McCoy was beaten to death by anti-mutant protesters during the March Of Purity.
 Callisto – Prisoner on Alcatraz who is freed by Basilisk when he escapes. She later goes to Fortress X.
 Camp Gorge's Mutants – The following characters were seen in Camp Gorge during a prison riot:
 Blob – Shown fighting the Hulk.
 Maggott – Killed by Iron Man.
 Mammomax – Briefly seen during prison riot.
 Marrow – Participated in prison riots. She would have been strangled by Ghost Rider if not for the arrival of Chamber, who killed him.
 Omega Red – Briefly seen during prison riot when the Hulk throws the Blob into him and Rusty Collins.
 Riptide – Briefly seen during prison riot.
 Rusty Collins – Briefly seen during prison riot when the Hulk throws the Blob into him and Omega Red.
 Copycat – Infiltrated Cannonball's X-Force. She was unmasked and killed by Husk.
 Debrii – During a memory experience by Tempo, Debrii was among the mutants captured by the Sapien League and paraded around as a dangerous mutant.
 Destiny – Died in custody.
 Doctor Nemesis He was seen frozen and distorted in a room unknown to Magneto at the center of Fortress X. Gambit sees that he is looking at brain scans (probably Legion's).
 Doctor Strange – A Mutant-hunter for hire. He is actually a double agent (working with Magneto) who teleports mutants to Fortress X.
 Elixir – During Tempo's memory experience, Elixir was among the mutants captured by the Sapien League and paraded around as a dangerous mutant.
 Fantastic Four – Mister Fantastic, Human Torch and Thing were arrested by the mutant hunters when they were informed by Invisible Woman that they harbored Wolfsbane.
 Feral – Mentioned briefly by Rogue and Tempo as dead.
 Guthrie Family – Killed by a trigger-happy guard, but no one was prosecuted since two mutants had been born into the family.
 Gabriel Cohuelo – Retreated to the sewers of Manhattan as a fugitive with Dazzler and Angel Salvadore. After being tracked down by Doctor Strange, he is teleported to Fortress X with his two companions. Begins using the codename "Velocidad" when he arrives at Fortress X.
 Havok – Killed by his brother Basilisk (who was forced to do that by Arcade).
 Jean Grey – Grey's Phoenix Force ability manifested, causing destruction and death in Albany. Although she was presumed dead when air forces bombed the area, a phoenix emerged from the rubble.
 Kavita Rao – Living in Fortress X, she became a traitor to humanity when she sided with the mutants.
 Mary Jane Watson – Spider-Man's wife here, she is a fugitive who is pregnant with a baby girl. Spider-Man sends her to Paris (to avoid arrest for being pregnant with a potentially superhuman infant) while her fetus was small enough to escape detection.
 Masque –
 Mister Sinister – A flashback shows that Mister Sinister was killed by Redback.
 Moira MacTaggert – One of the few humans allowed to live in Fortress X because of her sympathy with the mutant cause. Legion's stepmother found Moira a place in the Fortress. Revealed to be X, the voice controlling Fortress X and creator of this reality.
 Multiple Man – Mentioned briefly by Rogue as dead.
 Nightcrawler – Mentioned briefly by Rogue as dead.
 Neophyte – Provided information on Legacy and Magento.
 Onyxx – Recruited to Magneto's cause by Nightmare.
 Polaris – Suspected to be Magneto's daughter, a prisoner of Alcatraz who died while trying to escape.
 Pyro – Killed by Redback during a raid on Fortress X.
 Quicksilver – Although he was shown still alive fighting the Exonim that killed his sister, it is implied that he was among those killed by Exonim during the Decimation.
 Sabretooth – During Tempo's memory experience, Sabretooth was captured by the Sapiens League and paraded around as a dangerous mutant. Later, he was made a tracker for the Avengers in exchange for his freedom. Known by the Avengers as Weapon-S, his jaw was replaced with two metal tusks. his vocabulary suggests that the injury to his jaw left him with brain damage. Holds a grudge against Wolverine, where he uses his scent to track down Fortress X. Killed by Hulk when the Avengers find Fortress X.
 Scarlet Witch – She was among those killed by Exonim during the Decimation.
 Siryn – Subject of Banner's experiment who caused the accident turning Banner into the Hulk. She was killed with the other prisoners in the ensuing explosion.
 Spider-Man – Here, Spider-Man is married to Mary Jane and is hunted by the Human Coalition after their discovery of Nick Fury's Secret Warriors. Due to their powers, the coalition assumed they were mutants and the government extended its reach to "Post-Muties" (people whose offspring would be considered mutants). Captured by the coalition while buying time for Mary Jane to escape with their unborn daughter.
 Vulcan – Vulcan is in an induced coma at the Barton-Howell research facility.
 Wind Dancer – Recruited to Magneto's cause by Nightmare.
 Wolfsbane – Harbored by the Fantastic Four until she almost harmed Franklin Richards, leading Invisible Woman to report her to the mutant hunters.

Fortress X
Fortress X is a mutant haven which is the main setting for this storyline. Magneto used the skyscrapers in which the mutants were cornered, the Chrysler Building, the Empire State Building and Grand Central Terminal to create it by controlling the buildings' frameworks, removing them and reconstructing them as one large building. Grand Central Terminal is the fortress' security hub. Fortress X is in a battle-scarred wasteland.

Fortress X interweaves stairways and streets in residential and communal areas. Private dormitories are used by each mutant or couple. Mutant inhabitants may drink and play cards at the Rat Run bar operated by Wolverine. There is also an observatory where Madison Jeffries works.

Magneto has a large observation room containing a pillar with monitors mounted on it. The X-Brig is a high-security vault many stories above ground that imprisons dangerous mutants.

Issues
 Age of X: Alpha
 X-Men: Legacy #245–249
 New Mutants (vol. 3) #22–24
 Age of X: Universe #1–2

Collected edition

Reception
Age of X: Alpha received a rating of 7.5 out of 10 from IGN, and a rating of 3.5 out of 5 from Comic Book Resources. The reviews described it as a good setup, providing a framework for the rest of the series. X-Men: Legacy #245 received a rating of 3.5 out of 5 from Comic Book Resources.

References

External links
 UK Comics review
 Comic Book Resources review